The following is a list of squads for each nation competing at 2006 World Baseball Classic. The tournament began on March 3 and the final took place on March 20, 2006.

The teams listed on the country's roster is the team the player was with while the tournament took place.

Pool A

China Roster

Manager: Jim Lefebvre

Coaches: Bruce Hurst (Pitching)

Chinese Taipei Roster

Manager: Lin Hua-wei (林華韋)

Coaches: Hung I-chung (洪一中), Yeh Chih-shien (葉志仙), Lu Ming-tsu (呂明賜), Wu Fu-lien (吳復連), Hsieh Chang-heng (謝長亨)

Manager: 89 – Sadaharu Oh (王貞治)

Coaches: 84 – Kazuhiro Takeda (武田一浩), 85 – Hatsuhiko Tsuji (辻発彦), 86 – Yoshitaka Katori (鹿取義隆), 87 – Yasunori Oshima (大島康徳), 88 – Sumio Hirota (弘田澄男)

Manager: Kim In-sik (김인식)
Coaches: 70 — Kim Jae-bak (hitting coach), 90 — Sun Dong-yol (pitching coach), 80 — Cho Bum-hyun (battery coach), 75 — Ryu Joong-il (defensive coach), 76 — Ryu Ji-hyun (base coach)

Pool B

Manager: Ernie Whitt (First base coach with the Toronto Blue Jays)

Coaches: Denis Boucher (Pitching Coach), Tim Leiper (Coach), Rob Ducey (Coach), Larry Walker (Coach), Tommy Craig (Trainer)

Manager: Francisco Estrada

Pitching coaches: Fernando Valenzuela, Ted Higuera

Pitching coach: Lee Smith

Manager: Buck Martinez

Coaches: Marcel Lachemann, Davey Johnson, John McLaren, Reggie Smith

Pool C

Manager: Higinio Vélez

Manager: Robert Eenhoorn

Manager: Anibal Reluz

Manager: José Oquendo

Pool D

Manager: Jon Deeble

Manager: Manny Acta

Manager: Matt Galante

Manager: Luis Sojo

Coaches: Dave Concepción, Oscar Escobar, Roberto Espinoza, Omar Malavé, Luis Salazar

Notes and references

 Rosters: China, Chinese Taipei, Japan, Korea, Canada, Mexico, South Africa, USA, Cuba, Netherlands, Panama, Puerto Rico, Australia, Dominican Republic, Italy, Venezuela

Rosters, 2006 World Baseball Classic
World Baseball Classic